Virgin Bhanupriya is a 2020 Indian Hindi-language comedy drama film directed by Ajay Lohan and produced by Shreyans Mahendra Dhariwal. The film stars Urvashi Rautela in the lead role, with Gautam Gulati, Archana Puran Singh and Rumana Molla playing supporting roles. The film is a family comedy that explores relationship between youngsters and their families. The film was scheduled for theatrical release in India and received negative reviews, but has moved to release on 16 July 2020 through ZEE5 due to the COVID-19 pandemic.

Cast 
 Urvashi Rautela as Bhanupriya Awasthi (Bhanu)
 Gautam Gulati as Shartiya / Abhimanyu
Archana Puran Singh as Madhu Awasthi, Bhanupriya's mother
 Rumana Molla as Rukul Singh
 Rajiv Gupta as Vijay Awasthi, Bhanupriya's father 
 Brijendra Kala as Police Inspector
 Niki Aneja Walia as Moon
 Natasha Suri as Sonali
 Sumit Gulati as Rajiv
 Chaitnya Kanhai as Alex
 Pranav Verma as Jhanda
 Ashutosh Senwal as Chukiya
 Amrit Arora as Pungi
 Ayush Gupta as Computer Geek
 Delnaaz Irani as Tarot Card Reader
 Shiv Kumar as Shartiya's Father
 Dimple Chauhan as Shartiya's Mother
 Kamlesh Kumar Mishra as Pandit
Vikas Verma as Irfan

Release 
Due to the COVID-19 pandemic, the film was not released theatrically and was streamed on ZEE5 worldwide on 16 July 2020.

Soundtrack 

The film's music was composed by Chirrantan Bhatt, Ramji Gulati, Amjad Nadeem Aamir and Saurabh-Vaibhav while lyrics written by Manoj Yadav, Kumaar, Alokik Rahi, Amjad Nadeem, Ajay Lohan and Sumit Sharma.

Critical reception
Pallabi Dey Purkayastha of The Times of India rated the film 2/5, calling it "another run-of-the-mill tale on sexual liberation". Devasheesh Pandey of News18 gave the film 2.5 stars out of 5, writing ″Urvashi Rautela's 'Virgin Bhanupriya' is not a disguised sex comedy and functions more as a family drama. It brings forth how the society sees sexual curiosity as something scandalous.″ Bollywood Hungama gave the film 2 stars out of 5, writing ″VIRGIN BHANUPRIYA is 1 hour 50 minutes long and starts off with the central plot without wasting any time. Some of the situations in the film are funny, on paper, but doesn’t translate the same way on screen. The track of Rajiv is mediocre. Shartiya’s entry is heroic and one expects the film to get better. Sadly, that doesn’t really happen. The film should have been high on humour and also emotional moments and barring a joke or two, nothing really works. The climax is haphazard and even though the twist is kind of unexpected, the impact is not made.″

References

External links
 
 
 Virgin Bhanupriya on ZEE5

2020s Hindi-language films
Indian comedy-drama films
Films postponed due to the COVID-19 pandemic
Films about virginity
Films not released in theaters due to the COVID-19 pandemic
ZEE5 original films
2020 direct-to-video films
2020 films
2020 comedy-drama films